Theodore Yuyun is a professional footballer from Cameroon.

He previously played for Os Belenenses in the Portuguese Primeira Liga and Osotspa Saraburi F.C. in the Thai Premier League.

References

External links 

Thai Soccer Net

Futebol Portugal
Weltfussball
Thai League Football

1989 births
Living people
People from Bamenda
Cameroonian footballers
Cameroonian expatriate footballers
Cameroonian expatriate sportspeople in Portugal
Expatriate footballers in Portugal
C.F. Os Belenenses players
Primeira Liga players
Cameroonian expatriate sportspeople in Thailand
Expatriate footballers in Thailand
Theodore Yuyun
Theodore Yuyun
Theodore Yuyun
Association football midfielders
Theodore Yuyun